4 Pashons - Coptic calendar - 6 Pashons

Fixed commemorations
All fixed commemorations below are observed on 5 Pashons (13 May) by the Coptic Orthodox Church.

Saints
Prophet Jeremiah

Days of the Coptic calendar